The Maracaibo wood turtle (Rhinoclemmys diademata) is a species of turtles in the family Geoemydidae. The species is endemic to northern South America.

Geographic range
R. diademata is found in Colombia and Venezuela.

References

Bibliography

Further reading
Mertens R (1954). "Zur Kenntnis der Schildkrötenfauna Venezuelas ". Senckenbergiana Biologica 35 (1/2): 3-7. (Geoemyda punctularia diademata, new subspecies). (in German).

Rhinoclemmys
Reptiles of Colombia
Reptiles of Venezuela
Reptiles described in 1954